Harald Fischer-Tiné (born 1966) is a professor of Modern Global History at ETH Zürich, Switzerland.

Selected publications
Shyamji Krishnavarma: Sanskrit, Sociology and Anti-Imperialism. 2014.
Pidgin-Knowledge: Wissen und Kolonialismus. 2013.

References

Living people
1966 births
20th-century Swiss historians
Swiss male writers
German male non-fiction writers
21st-century Swiss historians